Douglas Edwards Evans (born May 13, 1970) is a former American football cornerback in the National Football League. He was drafted by the Green Bay Packers in the 6th round (141st overall) of the 1993 NFL Draft out of Louisiana Tech. He won Super Bowl XXXI with the 1996 Green Bay Packers against the New England Patriots. Evans also played for the Carolina Panthers, the Seattle Seahawks, and the Detroit Lions. In 2001, he set a Panthers franchise record with 8 interceptions.

External links
NFL.com player page

1970 births
Living people
Players of American football from Shreveport, Louisiana
American football cornerbacks
American football safeties
Louisiana Tech Bulldogs football players
Green Bay Packers players
Carolina Panthers players
Seattle Seahawks players
Detroit Lions players